Michel Gill (born April 16, 1960), also known as Michael Gill, is an American actor best known for playing President Garrett Walker in the Netflix series House of Cards and Gideon Goddard on Mr. Robot.

Early life
Gill is a first generation American born to Jewish parents who escaped the Holocaust. Gill's first language was French. He studied at Aiglon College, a prestigious boarding school in Switzerland. After Aiglon, he attended Tufts University before transferring and graduating from the Juilliard School in 1985 (Group 14).

Filmography

Television

Film
 Afflicted (film) (2013)
 Condemned (2015)
 Who Killed JonBenét? (2016)

Personal life
Gill is married to fellow House of Cards actor Jayne Atkinson (Secretary of State Catherine Durant), whom he met when they were both in a production of The Heiress at the Long Wharf Theatre in New Haven, Connecticut.

They began dating in 1992 and were married in 1998.  Gill and Atkinson reside with their son in the Berkshires.

References

External links

1960 births
20th-century American male actors
21st-century American male actors
American male television actors
Jewish American male actors
Juilliard School alumni
Living people
Male actors from New York City
Tufts University alumni
21st-century American Jews
20th-century American Jews
Alumni of Aiglon College